Pushkin is a crater on Mercury. Its name was adopted by the International Astronomical Union (IAU) in 1976. Pushkin is named for Russian poet Alexander Pushkin.

Pushkin lies south of Tsurayuki crater, and north of Ovid crater, which are named after 10th century Japanese poet Ki no Tsurayuki, and 1st century BC Roman poet Ovid, respectively.

References

Impact craters on Mercury